The Tempter may refer to:
 The Antichrist (film), 1974 Italian horror film also released as The Tempter
 The Devil Is a Woman (1974 film), 1974 Italian-British film released in UK as The Tempter
 The Seducer, a painting by Magritte originally Le Séducteur, sometimes translated as The Tempter

See also
 Tempter (album), a 1993 album by the Dutch death metal band Nembrionic Hammerdeath